"Run" is a single released by Indie band Vampire Weekend. It is the sixth and final single from their second album Contra, and was released in the United Kingdom on December 13, 2010. There was no music video produced. Lead singer Ezra Koenig said that the song was based on the Bruce Springsteen song, "Born to Run".

Critical reception
The Quietus writer Darren Lee said that the bleep-aided, sashaying majesty of "Run" showed the band playing to their strengths.

Track listing

CD Single
"Run (Radio Edit)" – 3:40
"Run" – 3:52

Digital download
"Run" – 3:52

Personnel
Vampire Weekend
 Ezra Koenig – lead vocals, guitar
 Rostam Batmanglij – piano, background vocals, vocal harmonies, keyboards, harpsichord, VSS-30, drum, synth, sampler programming
 Christopher Tomson – drums
 Chris Baio – bass

Technical
 Rostam Batmanglij – mixing, engineering
 Justin Gerrish – mixing, engineering
 Shane Stoneback – engineering
 Fernando Lodeiro – engineering assistance
 Emily Lazar – mastering
 Joe LaPorta – assistant mastering engineering

Charts

References

2010 singles
Vampire Weekend songs
2010 songs
Songs written by Rostam Batmanglij
XL Recordings singles
Song recordings produced by Rostam Batmanglij
Songs written by Ezra Koenig